Coast purple tip may refer to
Colotis erone, a butterfly endemic to Natal, Pondoland, Eswatini, and Transvaal
Colotis hetaera, a butterfly endemic to Kenya and Tanzania

Animal common name disambiguation pages